Mitch Markowitz is an American screenwriter best known for writing the film Good Morning, Vietnam. He also wrote the movie Crazy People.  His television credits include M*A*S*H, Van Dyke and Company, Best of the West, Report To Murphy, What's Happening?, Buffalo Bill, Monk, and Too Close For Comfort, among others.

External links
 

Living people
American male screenwriters
Year of birth missing (living people)